3rd SDFCS Awards 
December 18, 1998

Best Film: 
 Gods and Monsters 
The 3rd San Diego Film Critics Society Awards, given by the San Diego Film Critics Society on 18 December 1998, honored the best in film for 1998.

Winners
Best Actor:
Ian McKellen - Gods and Monsters
Best Actress:
Susan Sarandon - Stepmom
Best Director:
John Madden - Shakespeare in Love
Best Film: 
Gods and Monsters
Best Foreign Language Film:
Life is Beautiful (La vita è bella) • Italy
Best Screenplay - Adapted:
A Simple Plan - Scott B. Smith
Best Screenplay - Original:
Sliding Doors - Peter Howitt
Best Supporting Actor:
Billy Bob Thornton - A Simple Plan
Best Supporting Actress:
Kathy Bates - Primary Colors
Special Award:
Gwyneth Paltrow - Sliding Doors and Shakespeare in Love

1
1998 film awards
1998 in American cinema